Lookin' Good may refer to:
 Lookin' Good!, a 1961 album by Joe Gordon
 Lookin' Good (album), a 1980 album by Loretta Lynn
 "Lookin' Good", a 1967 song by Magic Sam from his album West Side Soul
 "Lookin' Good", a 2002 song by Jamie Cullum from his album Pointless Nostalgic
 "Lookin' Good", a 2005 song by the Bratz Rock Angelz from their album Rock Angelz